Lucas de Figueiredo Crispim (born 19 June 1994), known as Lucas Crispim or simply Crispim, is a Brazilian footballer who plays for Fortaleza as an attacking midfielder.

Club career
Born in Brasília, Federal District, Crispim joined Santos FC's youth setup in 2007, aged 13. On 12 August 2013 he signed a new deal with the club, running until December 2016.

In January 2014 Crispim suffered a thigh injury, being sidelined for a month. On 7 May he was loaned to Série B side Vasco da Gama until December.

Crispim made his professional debut on 12 August, starting in a 1–0 away win against Náutico. He scored his first goal on 3 October, netting his side's first of a 2–2 home draw against Bragantino, and finished the campaign with 12 appearances and two goals, as the Cruz-Maltino returned to Série A at first attempt.

On 6 January 2015 Crispim returned to Peixe. He made his debut for the club on 1 February, coming on as a late substitute for Robinho in a 3–0 home win against Ituano.

On 18 June 2015 Crispim was loaned to fellow top division club Joinville, until the end of the year. Returning to Santos in January 2016, he appeared rarely before serving another loan stint at second tier side Atlético Goianiense; he also appeared rarely with the club, which achieved promotion as champions.

On 9 February 2017, after being demoted to the B-team upon returning from loan, Crispim joined Ituano also in a temporary deal. On 14 December, after again featuring rarely, he signed a one-year deal with São Bento.

On 7 January 2019, Guarani confirmed the signing of Crispim.

Career statistics

Honours
Santos
 Campeonato Paulista: 2015, 2016

Atlético Goianiense
 Campeonato Brasileiro Série B: 2016

Fortaleza
 Campeonato Cearense: 2021, 2022
 Copa do Nordeste: 2022

References

External links
 Profile on Guarani FC
 

1994 births
Living people
Footballers from Brasília
Brazilian footballers
Association football midfielders
Campeonato Brasileiro Série A players
Campeonato Brasileiro Série B players
Santos FC players
CR Vasco da Gama players
Joinville Esporte Clube players
Atlético Clube Goianiense players
Ituano FC players
Esporte Clube São Bento players
Guarani FC players
Fortaleza Esporte Clube players